Club Gorilas de Juanacatlán is a football club that plays in the Liga TDP. It is based in the city of Juanacatlán.

History 
The team was founded in 2016 with the aim of training professional players from neighboring towns: El Salto and Juanacatlán, Jalisco. 

In the 2018–19 season, the team finished in third position of group X with 81 points. So Gorilas managed to qualify for the promotion playoff. On the Round of 32 Gorilas defeated Valle F.C. by 9–1 on the aggregate, however, in the Round of 16 the Juanacatlán team was eliminated by Orgullo Surtam on penalty series after drawing 2–2 in the aggregate.

In the 2020–21 season, the team finished in second position of group X with 90 points. In the play-offs stage, the club eliminated the clubs Lobos ITECA and Petroleros SJR, to reach the quarterfinals of the zone, in which they were eliminated by La Tribu de Ciudad Juárez, however, this has been their best participation in the history of the club.

References 

Football clubs in Jalisco
Association football clubs established in 2016
2016 establishments in Mexico